Kolu is a village in Türi Parish, Järva County in central Estonia.  Kolu railway station on the Tallinn - Viljandi railway line operated by Elron (rail transit) is a short distance from the village.

Kolu Manor
Kolu estate dates from 1639, when it was founded by Peter Grote. The Baltic German Grote (later Grotenhielm) family owned the property until 1875, after which it switched hands a few times before becoming a school in the 20th century. It is today private property. The main building was built 1888-1890 and designed by architect Erwin Bernhard. In 1905, after being devastated during riots during the Revolution of 1905, a corner tower was added to the building.

References

Villages in Järva County